John Frederick "Jerry" Cornes (23 March 1910 – 19 June 2001) was an English middle distance runner, colonial officer, and schoolmaster. He was born in Darjeeling, British India.

Early life
The son of a judge in the Indian Civil Service, Cornes was educated at Clifton College and won a scholarship to Corpus Christi College, Oxford, where he read history. He stayed at Oxford for an extra year, studying one of the languages of Nigeria and learning how to work in the colonies. He left Oxford in 1932, when he competed in the Olympics at Los Angeles.

Career
After the 1932 Olympic Games, Cornes was posted to Nigeria as a civil servant. He stayed there for five years, during which time he was given leave to attend the 1936 Games in Berlin. He only decided to go for the '36 Olympics a year before, so he did no intensive training in between, but during that time he raced a local Nigerian around the walls of Katsima and lost.

In 1937, Cornes returned from Nigeria and on 12 June he married Rachael Addis in Frant, Sussex. Their marriage was extremely happy. In 1997, they celebrated their diamond wedding anniversary.

Also in 1937, he went to work for the civil service in Palestine, as assistant district officer of Ramallah, in Judea. He also worked in Hebron and Safad. His three elder sons, Nick, Colin and John were born in Palestine. He was working at the King David Hotel at the time of the King David Hotel bombing. He was curious when he heard a small explosive blast in the street outside the hotel, which had been set off by terrorists to keep passers-by away from the area. He went outside to investigate, and while he was outside a bomb inside the hotel was detonated, killing everyone on his floor. 
 
Cornes left Palestine in 1947. Returning home, he worked for the Colonial Office and taught colonial service students at Oxford until 1953. His youngest son, Andrew, was born during this period. In 1953, he came into an inheritance and bought West Downs School, Winchester, where he taught history, Religious Studies and Latin, as well as being headmaster. He retired in 1988 and the school was closed down.

Athlete
Cornes first became interested in running at Clifton, where he won the seven-mile cross-country 'Long Pen Pole' race, as his father had done twice before him. When the Achilles Club from Oxford and Cambridge came for a match against Clifton, he beat, on handicap, Douglas Lowe, who was an Olympic champion.

At Oxford, he won the Freshman cross-country race.

He competed for Great Britain and Northern Ireland at the 1932 Summer Olympics held in Los Angeles, in the 1500 metres where he won the silver medal. His time was 3 minutes 52 seconds. He then competed in the 1936 Summer Olympics in Berlin, gaining sixth place in the 1500 metres event but running his personal best time of 3 minutes 51.4 seconds. The race was exceptional because the first two runners broke World Records and the first five, Olympic Records.

At the 1930 Empire Games he won the bronze medal in the 1 mile event. Four years later at the 1934 Empire Games he won again the bronze medal in the 1 mile competition.

References

External links
 
 Obituary in the Daily Telegraph

1910 births
2001 deaths
People from Darjeeling
English male middle-distance runners
Olympic athletes of Great Britain
Athletes (track and field) at the 1932 Summer Olympics
Athletes (track and field) at the 1936 Summer Olympics
Olympic silver medallists for Great Britain
Athletes (track and field) at the 1930 British Empire Games
Athletes (track and field) at the 1934 British Empire Games
Commonwealth Games bronze medallists for England
Alumni of Corpus Christi College, Oxford
People educated at Clifton College
Heads of schools in England
Commonwealth Games medallists in athletics
Medalists at the 1932 Summer Olympics
Olympic silver medalists in athletics (track and field)
British people in colonial India
Medallists at the 1930 British Empire Games
Medallists at the 1934 British Empire Games